Bob Young (2 January 1933 – 1 October 2014) was a Scottish cricketer. He played six first-class matches for Scotland between 1962 and 1964.

References

External links
 

1933 births
2014 deaths
Scottish cricketers
Cricketers from Perth, Scotland